Nieder-Hilbersheim is an Ortsgemeinde – a municipality belonging to a Verbandsgemeinde, a kind of collective municipality – in the Mainz-Bingen district in Rhineland-Palatinate, Germany.

Geography

Location
The municipality lies southwest of Mainz in the Welzbach valley and is characterized by agriculture. The winegrowing centre belongs to the Verbandsgemeinde of Gau-Algesheim, whose seat is in the like-named town.

History
In 933, Nieder-Hilbersheim had its first documentary mention in a document from the Seligenstadt Abbey.

In the endowment letter from the Disbodenberg Monastery in 1108, Nieder-Hilbersheim is mentioned for the first time as Hilbriedesheim

After 1300, the name Nieder-Hilbersheim first came up in documents.

In 1334 a church is mentioned for the first time, and is believed to have been consecrated to Saint Martin, which yielded today's coat of arms, which show Saint Martin cutting a piece of his cloak off for a beggar. At this point, the community belonged to the Electorate of the Palatinate Oberamt of Stromberg.

Politics

The municipal council is made up of 12 council members, not counting the part-time mayor, with seats apportioned thus:

(as at municipal election held on 13 June 2004)

Culture and sightseeing

Regular events
The Nieder-Hilbersheim kermis (church consecration festival, locally known as the Kerb) is always held on the second weekend in September. A farmer's and craftsman's market is held each year on the third weekend in October.

Economy and infrastructure

Agriculture
Nieder-Hilbersheim grows grapes for both white and red wine, and also fruit and asparagus.

Transport
The municipality is crossed by Landesstraße (state road) 415. The  A 60 and A 63 autobahns can be reached by car in 10 to 20 minutes.

Education
Nieder-Hilbersheim has a municipal kindergarten.

References

External links

 Municipality’s official webpage 

Mainz-Bingen